The 2006 WNBA season was their eighth season and their fourth in Connecticut. The Sun attempted to return to the postseason for the fourth consecutive season and were successful. Before the season started, many thought the Sun would make their third consecutive trip to the WNBA Finals, but lost to the eventual champion Detroit Shock in 3 games.

Offseason

WNBA draft

Transactions
July 24: The Sun signed Jessica Brungo.
July 13: The Sun signed Brooke Queenan.
June 29: The Sun waived Ambrosia Anderson.
May 19: The Sun waived Donna Loffhagen and Jennifer Derevjanik.
May 16: The Sun waived Brooke Queenan.
May 15: The Sun waived Monique Coker.
May 13: The Sun waived Katie Cronin and Jessica Brungo.
May 12: The Sun signed Brooke Queenan.
May 11: The Sun signed Ambrosia Anderson.
April 6: The Sun signed Katie Cronin.
March 27: The Sun have agreed to terms with Erin Phillips.
March 15: The Sun signed Monique Coker.
March 1: The Sun resigned Jennifer Derevjanik.
February 28: The Sun resigned Jamie Carey.
February 27: The Sun resigned Laura Summerton and Le'Coe Willingham and signed Donna Loffhagen.
February 10: The Sun resigned Asjha Jones.
February 7: The Sun resigned Nykesha Sales.
February 1: The Sun announced the signings of Megan Mahoney and Candace Futrell.

Roster

Season standings

Schedule

Preseason

|- align="center" bgcolor="ffbbbb"
| 1 || May 7 || Detroit || L 58-77 || Carey (10) || Jones (8) || Phillips (6) || Mohegan Sun Arena  7,272 || 0-1
|- align="center" bgcolor="ffbbbb"
| 2 || May 9 || @ Sacramento || L 73-74 || Sales (19) || Jones (7) || N/A || University Arena  6,392 || 0-2
|- align="center" bgcolor="bbffbb"
| 3 || May 13 || @ Phoenix || W 96-85 || Sales (30) || McWilliams-Franklin (9) || Douglas (4) || US Airways Center  2,069 || 1-2
|-

Regular season

|- align="center" bgcolor="bbffbb"
| 1
|  May 20
|  New York
| W 91-74
| Sales (19)
| Sales (10)
| Whalen, Sales (5)
| Mohegan Sun Arena  8,316
| 1-0
|- align="center" bgcolor="bbffbb"
| 2
|  May 23
|  @ Minnesota
| W 81-69
| Douglas (28)
| McWilliams-Franklin (11)
| Whalen (6)
| Target Center  9,471
| 2-0
|- align="center" bgcolor="ffbbbb"
| 3
|  May 27
|  Detroit
| L 73-77 (OT)
| Douglas (18)
| McWilliams-Franklin, Douglas (7)
| Whalen (5)
| Mohegan Sun Arena  6,738
| 2-1
|-

|- align="center" bgcolor="bbffbb"
| 4
|  June 1
|  @ Charlotte
| W 89-65
| Sales (18)
| Dydek (15)
| Douglas (5)
| Charlotte Bobcats Arena  3,632
| 3-1
|- align="center" bgcolor="bbffbb"
| 5
|  June 3
|  Charlotte
| W 89-71
| Dydek (17)
| McWilliams-Franklin (15)
| Sales (5)
| Mohegan Sun Arena  7,318
| 4-1
|- align="center" bgcolor="bbffbb"
| 6
|  June 7
| @ New York
| W 75-60
| Douglas (17)
| McWilliams-Franklin (7)
| Sales, Phillips (4)
| Madison Square Garden  10,180
| 5-1
|- align="center" bgcolor="bbffbb"
| 7
|  June 9
|  Seattle
| W 85-81
| Douglas (18)
| Dydek (12)
| Whalen (9)
| Mohegan Sun Arena  7,138
| 6-1
|- align="center" bgcolor="bbffbb"
| 8
|  June 13
|  Washington
| W 85-71
| Douglas (26)
| Douglas (7)
| Whalen, Jones (4)
| Mohegan Sun Arena  6,339
| 7-1
|- align="center" bgcolor="ffbbbb"
| 9
|  June 16
|  @ Phoenix
| L 86-91
| Douglas (27)
| McWilliams-Franklin (17)
| Whalen (4)
| US Airways Center  6,378
| 7-2
|- align="center" bgcolor="ffbbbb"
| 10
|  June 17
|  @ Los Angeles
| L 70-82
| Jones (16)
| Sales, Dydek, Jones (5)
| Whalen (5)
| STAPLES Center  7,991
| 7-3
|- align="center" bgcolor="bbffbb"
| 11
|  June 20
|  @ Charlotte
| W 90-66
| Sales (15)
| McWilliams-Franklin (9)
| Whalen (6)
| Charlotte Bobcats Arena  4,243
| 8-3
|- align="center" bgcolor="bbffbb"
| 12
|  June 22
|  Minnesota
| W 79-62
| Whalen, Dydek (16)
| Jones (11)
| Sales (4)
| Mohegan Sun Arena  6,573
| 9-3
|- align="center" bgcolor="bbffbb"
| 13
|  June 23
|  @ Chicago
| W 84-79
| Sales (23)
| McWilliams-Franklin (14)
| Whalen (6)
| UIC Pavilion  2,818
| 10-3
|- align="center" bgcolor="ffbbbb"
| 14
|  June 25
|  @ Washington
| L 80-87
| McWilliams-Franklin, Sales, Jones (15)
| McWilliams-Franklin (11)
| Whalen (6)
| MCI Center  7,216
| 10-4
|- align="center" bgcolor="bbffbb"
| 15
|  June 27
|  Houston
| W 73-57
| Sales (19)
| Dydek (13)
| Whalen (6)
| Mohegan Sun Arena  6,220
| 11-4
|- align="center" bgcolor="ffbbbb"
| 16
|  June 30
|  Detroit
| L 64-70
| Jones (16)
| McWilliams-Franklin (10)
| Whalen (5)
| Mohegan Sun Arena  7,003
| 11-5
|-

|- align="center" bgcolor="bbffbb"
| 17
|  July 1
|  @ Indiana
| W 76-66
| Douglas (22)
| Whalen (10)
| Whalen, Sales (3)
| Conseco Fieldhouse  7,033
| 12-5
|- align="center" bgcolor="bbffbb"
| 18
|  July 6
|  Charlotte
| W 76-71
| Whalen (20)
| Dydek (9)
| Whalen (5)
| Mohegan Sun Arena  6,019
| 13-5
|- align="center" bgcolor="bbffbb"
| 19
|  July 8
|  Phoenix
| W 82-77
| Douglas (22)
| McWilliams-Franklin (12)
| McWilliams-Franklin (5)
| Mohegan Sun Arena  9,341
| 14-5
|- align="center" bgcolor="ffbbbb"
| 20
|  July 15
|  @ Sacramento
| L 63-69
| McWilliams-Franklin (13)
| McWilliams-Franklin (10)
| Phillips (4)
| ARCO Arena  7,997
| 14-6
|- align="center" bgcolor="bbffbb"
| 21
|  July 16
|  @ Seattle
| W 92-83
| Douglas (26)
| Dydek (14)
| McWilliams-Franklin (7)
| KeyArena  8,952
| 15-6
|- align="center" bgcolor="bbffbb"
| 22
|  July 20
|  Chicago
| W 86-72
| Douglas (19)
| McWilliams-Franklin (8)
| Phillips (6)
| Mohegan Sun Arena  6,740
| 16-6
|- align="center" bgcolor="bbffbb"
| 23
|  July 22
|  @ San Antonio
| W 79-61
| Dydek (18)
| McWilliams-Franklin (10)
| McWilliams-Franklin, Whalen (7)
| AT&T Center  N/A
| 17-6
|- align="center" bgcolor="bbffbb"
| 24
|  July 24
|  @ New York
| W 89-71
| McWilliams-Franklin (22)
| Dydek (10)
| Douglas (6)
| Madison Square Garden  8,419
| 18-6
|- align="center" bgcolor="bbffbb"
| 25
|  July 25
|  Washington
| W 73-86
| Douglas (28)
| McWilliams-Franklin (12)
| McWilliams-Franklin (6)
| Mohegan Sun Arena  6,535
| 19-6
|- align="center" bgcolor="bbffbb"
| 26
|  July 28
|  Sacramento
| W 75-68
| Douglas (19)
| McWilliams-Franklin (14)
| Douglas (6)
| Mohegan Sun Arena  7,558
| 20-6
|- align="center" bgcolor="bbffbb"
| 27
|  July 30
|  San Antonio
| W 72-65
| Jones (22)
| Jones, Dydek (8)
| Carey (4)
| Mohegan Sun Arena  7,454
| 21-6
|-

|- align="center" bgcolor="bbffbb"
| 28
|  August 1
|  New York
| W 66-52
| Jones (22)
| McWilliams-Franklin, Dydek (10)
| Phillips (5)
| Mohegan Sun Arena  7,159
| 22-6
|- align="center" bgcolor="bbffbb"
| 29
|  August 3
|  Los Angeles
| W 72-63
| McWilliams-Franklin (22)
| Jones (10)
| Phillips (5)
| Mohegan Sun Arena  8,675
| 23-6
|- align="center" bgcolor="bbffbb"
| 30
|  August 6
|  @ Houston
| W 86-67
| McWilliams-Franklin (21)
| McWilliams-Franklin (13)
| Whalen (9)
| Toyota Center  8,726
| 24-6
|- align="center" bgcolor="bbffbb"
| 31
|  August 8
|  @ Chicago
| W 85-59
| Douglas (19)
| McWilliams-Franklin (12)
| Whalen, Jones (5)
| UIC Pavilion  3,520
| 25-6
|- align="center" bgcolor="bbffbb"
| 32
|  August 9
|  @ Indiana
| W 71-63
| Jones (21)
| McWilliams-Franklin (14)
| Sales (4)
| Conseco Fieldhouse  7,368
| 26-6
|- align="center" bgcolor="ffbbbb"
| 33
|  August 11
|  Indiana
| L 68-87
| Whalen (16)
| McWilliams-Franklin (5)
| Phillips (4)
| Mohegan Sun Arena  9,341 (sellout)
| 26-7
|- align="center" bgcolor="ffbbbb"
| 34
|  August 13
|  @ Detroit
| L 65-88
| McWilliams-Franklin (13)
| McWilliams-Franklin, Sales (5)
| Phillips, Dydek (3)
| Palace of Auburn Hills  11,558
| 26-8
|-

Playoffs
In the first round of the Eastern Conference Playoffs, the Sun had to face the Washington Mystics. Since the Sun had the better record, the series would be played with game 1 at Washington, game 2 at Connecticut, and game 3 (if needed) at Connecticut. The Sun swept the Mystics and game 3 was not needed.
In the second round of the Eastern Conference Playoffs, the Sun had to face rival Detroit Shock. Again, the Sun had the better record and the series would be played with game 1 at Detroit and games 2 and 3 (if needed) at Connecticut. Even though the Sun had a better record in the regular season, Detroit had managed to beat Connecticut in all four of the season meetings. Surprisingly, the Sun won game two of the series but went on to lose game three on their home court. Detroit advanced to the WNBA Finals. Had Connecticut advanced, it would have been the third consecutive season the Sun had made it to the WNBA Finals.
For the fourth consecutive season, the Sun qualify for the Eastern Conference Playoffs.
For the fourth consecutive season, the Sun advance to the Eastern Conference Finals.

|- align="center" bgcolor="bbffbb"
| 1
|  August 18
|  @ Washington
| W 76-61
| Whalen (22)
| McWilliams-Franklin (14)
| McWilliams-Franklin (6)
| Verizon Center  8,547
| 1-0
|- align="center" bgcolor="bbffbb"
| 2
|  August 20
|  Washington
| W 68-65
| Douglas (16)
| McWilliams-Franklin (14)
| Sales (5)
| Mohegan Sun Arena  7,579
| 2-0
|-

|- align="center" bgcolor="ffbbbb"
| 1
|  August 24
|  @ Detroit
| L 59-70
| Whalen, Phillips (13)
| Dydek (8)
| McWilliams-Franklin, Whalen, Phillips (3)
| Palace of Auburn Hills  9,476
| 0-1
|- align="center" bgcolor="bbffbb"
| 2
|  August 26
|  Detroit
| W 77-73
| McWilliams-Franklin (18)
| Jones (8)
| Sales (4)
| Mohegan Sun Arena  7,377
| 1-1
|- align="center" bgcolor="ffbbbb"
| 3
|  August 27
|  Detroit
| L 55-79
| McWilliams-Franklin (12)
| Dydek (9)
| Sales (3)
| Mohegan Sun Arena  6,820
| 1-2
|-

Depth

Player stats
http://www.wnba.com/sun/stats/2006/

Awards and honors
Katie Douglas, Margo Dydek, Taj McWilliams-Franklin, Nykesha Sales, and Lindsay Whalen were named to the All-Star Team.
Katie Douglas was named the All-Star Game MVP.
Head coach Mike Thibault was named Coach of the Year.
Katie Douglas was named to the All-WNBA First Team.
Taj McWilliams-Franklin was named to the All-WNBA Second Team.
Katie Douglas was named to the WNBA All-Defensive First Team for the second consecutive year.
Margo Dydek was named to the WNBA All-Defensive Second Team.
Taj McWilliams-Franklin was named WNBA Eastern Conference Player of the Week for the week of July 24, 2006.
Taj McWilliams-Franklin was named WNBA Eastern Conference Player of the Week for the week of August 7, 2006.

References

External links

Connecticut Sun seasons
Connecticut
Connecticut Sun